Abdumajid Toirov (born 5 August 1974) is a retired Uzbekistan international footballer, who played as a defender.

Career statistics

International

As of match played 17 October 2000.

References

External links

1974 births
Living people
Uzbekistani footballers
Uzbekistan international footballers
FC Bunyodkor players
navbahor Namangan players
FK Neftchi Farg'ona players
Surkhon Termez players
FC AGMK players
Association football defenders
Uzbekistan Super League players
2000 AFC Asian Cup players